Garfield Township is a civil township of Mackinac County in the U.S. state of Michigan. The population was 1,146 at the 2010 census.

Communities 
It began as a lumber settlement called "Kennedy Siding" and was given a post office in August 1889. In December 1893, the name changed to Engadine. The Engadine 49827 ZIP Code serves most of Garfield Township, as well portions of Portage Township and Newton Township.
It was a lumber settlement with a station on the Minneapolis, St. Paul and Sault Ste. Marie Railroad. A post office operated from September 1879 to June 1883 and again from June 1888 until November 1906. It was named for John Gilchrist, a local landowner.
It is on the southern end of Millecoquins Lake, which divides the upper and lower segments of the Millecoquins River. The name Millecoquins (pronounced "mel-a-coke-ins)" is a French word meaning "a thousand thieves", which was derived from the Indian terms Manana koking or Minakoking, meaning a place where the hardwood is plentiful.
A post office was established in November 1879. The Naubinway 49762 ZIP code serves the southern portion of Garfield Township and a much larger area to the east, including most of Hudson Township, all of Hendricks Township, and a small western portion of Moran Township. The Garlyn Zoo, located to the east in Hudson Township, also uses the Naubinway ZIP Code. Naubinway Island lies a half mile south of the community.

Geography

Garfield Township is the northernmost municipality on the shores of Lake Michigan.  Near Naubinway, the northernmost point of Lake Michigan was designated as a Michigan State Historic Site named "the Northernmost Point of Lake Michigan" on April 14, 1964.  This point was used to draw the westernmost boundary of the Michigan Territory when it was created in 1805.  West of this point belonged to the Indiana Territory until the Michigan Territory expanded westward in 1818.

Demographics
As of the census of 2000, there were 1,251 people, 550 households, and 382 families residing in the township. The population density was 9.3 per square mile (3.6/km2). There were 1,029 housing units at an average density of 7.7 per square mile (3.0/km2). The racial makeup of the township was 82.09% White, 0.08% African American, 12.47% Native American, 0.16% Asian, 0.48% from other races, and 4.72% from two or more races. Hispanic or Latino of any race were 1.36% of the population.

There were 550 households, out of which 22.9% had children under the age of 18 living with them, 62.4% were married couples living together, 5.5% had a female householder with no husband present, and 30.4% were non-families. 26.7% of all households were made up of individuals, and 13.1% had someone living alone who was 65 years of age or older. The average household size was 2.27 and the average family size was 2.73.

In the township the population was spread out, with 19.5% under the age of 18, 5.2% from 18 to 24, 22.5% from 25 to 44, 29.4% from 45 to 64, and 23.4% who were 65 years of age or older. The median age was 47 years. For every 100 females, there were 95.8 males. For every 100 females age 18 and over, there were 96.7 males.

The median income for a household in the township was $34,712, and the median income for a family was $37,917. Males had a median income of $29,821 versus $26,146 for females. The per capita income for the township was $17,315. About 7.1% of families and 10.0% of the population were below the poverty line, including 8.1% of those under age 18 and 12.6% of those age 65 or over.

Transportation

Highways
  runs east–west along the southern edge of the township along the Lake Michigan coastline.
 , known locally as Hiawatha Trail, runs east–west through the center of the township.

Bus service
 Indian Trails provides daily intercity bus service via Engadine between St. Ignace and Ironwood, Michigan.

References

Townships in Mackinac County, Michigan
Townships in Michigan
Michigan populated places on Lake Michigan